District Heights is an incorporated municipality in Prince George's County, Maryland, United States, located near Maryland Route 4. Per the 2020 census, the population was 5,959. For more information, see the separate articles on Forestville and Suitland.

Geography
District Heights is located at  (38.859545, −76.889139).

History

District Heights was originally farmland owned by Major Leander P. Williams, purchased as four patented Lord Baltimore tracts known as: "Good Luck," "Magruder's Plains Enlarged," "the Levels," and "Offutt's Adventure." Under grants issued to Lord Baltimore by King Charles I of Great Britain, the tracts belonged to Colonel Ninian Beall, Benjamin Berry, and Alexander Magruder. District Heights evolved from one of the four patents. In 1925, 505-acres of the Williams farm was purchased and formed into the District Heights Company by Joseph Tepper, David L. Blanken, Henry Oxenberg, Gilbert Leventhal, Simon Gordon, and Simon Gerber. The land was farmed by Walter and Al Dustin, whose farmhouse stood at 7116 Foster Street. By 1925, streets laid out first three blocks of Halleck Street and Aztec. By 1926, the city had approximately 25 homes built, two businesses, a grocery store and filling station, a pump house and water tower to furnish the water and pressure for the City, a sewage system and a free Model T bus service to 17th and Pennsylvania Avenue, S.E. The Town of District Heights was incorporated in 1936 and recognized by act of the Maryland General Assembly. Many of the Cape Cod style houses seen today date to the 1940s, when several developers constructed affordable, single-family, houses with financing from the Federal Housing Administration (FHA), anticipating sales to federal employees and veterans returning from World War II. In 1946, the remaining and undeveloped 300-acres was bought and developed by New York City builder Samuel R. Rosoff, who established Washington Estates, Inc., thus adding additional tracts to District Heights which include areas now occupied by garden apartments.

Adjacent areas
 Walker Mill (north)
 Forestville (southeast)
 Capitol Heights (northwest)
 Morningside (south)

Demographics

2020 census

Note: the US Census treats Hispanic/Latino as an ethnic category. This table excludes Latinos from the racial categories and assigns them to a separate category. Hispanics/Latinos can be of any race.

2010 Census
As of the census of 2010, there were 5,837 people, 2,050 households, and 1,505 families residing in the city. The racial makeup of the city was 6.0% White, 90.1% African American, 0.2% Native American, 0.6% Asian, 1.1% from other races, and 1.9% from two or more races. Hispanic or Latino of any race were 3.7% of the population.

There were 2,050 households, of which 40.4% had children under the age of 18 living with them, 35.0% were married couples living together, 32.8% had a female householder with no husband present, 5.7% had a male householder with no wife present, and 26.6% were non-families. 22.5% of all households were made up of individuals, and 5.7% had someone living alone who was 65 years of age or older. The average household size was 2.85 and the average family size was 3.31.

The median age in the city was 35.8 years. 26.3% of residents were under the age of 18; 10.9% were between the ages of 18 and 24; 24.5% were from 25 to 44; 28.3% were from 45 to 64; and 10% were 65 years of age or older. The gender makeup of the city was 46.0% male and 54.0% female.

2000 Census
As of the census of 2000, there were 5,958 people, 2,070 households, and 1,538 families residing in the city. The racial makeup of the city was 9.20% White, 87.95% African American, 0.12% Native American, 0.86% Asian, 0.20% from other races, and 1.68% from two or more races. Hispanic or Latino of any race were 0.49% of the population.

There were 2,070 households, out of which 38.3% had children under the age of 18 living with them, 39.6% were married couples living together, 28.2% had a female householder with no husband present, and 25.7% were non-families. 22.1% of all households were made up of individuals, and 5.0% had someone living alone who was 65 years of age or older. The average household size was 2.88 and the average family size was 3.36.

In the city, the population was spread out, with 30.8% under the age of 18, 8.3% from 18 to 24, 29.3% from 25 to 44, 23.6% from 45 to 64, and 8.0% who were 65 years of age or older. The median age was 34 years. For every 100 females, there were 84.9 males. For every 100 females age 18 and over, there were 76.1 males.

The median income for a household in the city was $52,331, and the median income for a family was $61,220. Males had a median income of $37,129 versus $32,443 for females. The per capita income for the city was $21,190. About 4.5% of families and 5.9% of the population were below the poverty line, including 9.0% of those under age 18 and 6.1% of those age 65 or over.

Notable people
 Jane Campbell Hutchison, Professor Emerita Hutchison (1932-2020) grew-up in District Heights and was an expert in the history of Northern European art and taught art history at the University of Wisconsin from 1964 until her retirement in 2012.
Lloyd R. Woodson, arrested in 2010 with military-grade illegal weapons he intended to use in  a violent crime, and a detailed map of the Fort Drum military installation.
 NaVorro Bowman, former outside linebacker at Penn State University and former inside linebacker for the San Francisco 49ers and Oakland Raiders was born and attended high school in Forestville.
 East Coast Rapist, Aaron H. Thomas, lived in District Heights/Forestville from June 1994 to August 2006. 
 LaTonya Swann, winner of BET's Born To Dance, was born and raised in District Heights.
 Jack Anthony D’Ambrosio, (1943-2015) a decorated Oakland Park, Florida, police officer who spent his youth in District Heights and wrote several books  chronicling his amusing adventures in the "Apollos" teenage street gang that operated in the town in the 1950s.

Government
The city is governed by a mayor and city commission elected every 4 years.
The current elected mayor and city commission are: 
Mayor Cynthia Miller
Commissioner Anthony B. Tilghman (Ward 1);
Commissioner Xander Harcourt - (Ward 1)
Commissioner Gyasi Gomez (Ward 2);
Commissioner Pamela Janifer (Ward 2)

In June 2019, Mayor Martin was charged with misdemeanor misconduct in office for helping a friend buy $50,000 in fireworks only available to cities and those with a federal explosive license by asserting on city letterhead that they were for the city's Fourth of July celebration rather than for private use. This followed Martin's earlier charge of misconduct in office in 2013 (Circuit Court Case Number: CJ135672).

The U.S. Postal Service operates the District Heights Post Office in an unincorporated area next to the city limits. The post office is named for former and longtime town mayor E. Michael Roll, who championed its establishment.

History of Mayors
 1954-1956 L.T. Gates
 1956-1957 Thomas R. McEntegart
 1957-1963 E. Michael Roll
 1963-1965 Thomas R. McEntegart
 1965-1981 E. Michael Roll
 1981-1983 David H. Goldsmith
 1983-1985 William E. Hay
 1985-1987 David H. Goldsmith
 1987-1988 David W. Joy
 1988-1990 Charles L. Hudson
 1990-1991 Thomas S. Morrison
 1991-1997 Mary A. Pumphrey
 1997-2003 Jack C. Sims
 2003-2006 Carol D. Johnson
 2006-2016 James L. Walls, Jr. (died May 12, 2016)
 2016-2018 Jack C. Sims
 2018-2019 Eddie L. Martin (suspended Dec. 2, 2019)
 2019-2020 Johnathan Medlock, Acting Mayor
 2020-2022 Johnathan Medlock
 2022- Cynthia Miller

Law enforcement
The District Heights Police Department (DHPD) is the primary law enforcement agency for the City of District Heights which is located in Prince George's County, Maryland. An agreement exists with Prince George's County Police Department and the Prince George's County Sheriff's Office that outlines mutual aid assistance. Assistance is also provided by neighboring municipal agencies.

Officers serve the City Commission and the citizens who reside in and around the Municipal Corporation of District Heights. District Heights is located within the 8th District of the Prince George's County Police Department. The two agencies work closely together responding to calls for service as well as solving crimes. Although the crime rate as reported by the Federal Bureau of Investigation is twenty~two percent higher than the national average, this number represents both the non-corporate and corporate portions of District Heights.

The District Heights Police Department began in 1936. Over the years, it has seen many different officers. In 2012, Chief Michael March (Ret) retired, sparking the City Commission to temporarily appoint Chief (Fmr) Yolanda Alexander. Chief Alexander served as acting Chief for more than a year until she was fully sworn in as Chief of Police in October 2013. Her contract as Chief for the District Heights Police Department was not renewed after May 2014 City Mayoral and Commission elections. Several members stated a difference of opinion. Chief Elliott Gibson was hired in May 2014, as Police Chief.  Chief Gibson had a long history and experience in law enforcement. Chief Gibson received numerous commendations and awards for his community service during his tenure.  Chief Gibson was terminated by the City Commission after new Commissioners were elected in May 2019. The police department was overseen by the District 8 Commander and Asst. Commander of the Prince George's County Police Department until November 2020 when Interim Chief Kinsey Weems was appointed. Chief Weems has been a member of the agency since 2013.

In March of 2021, numerous fire and police agencies announced the arrest of former District Heights Police Chief David Michael Crawford in connection to a dozen fires between 2011 and 2020. In March of 2022 Crawford entered an Alford plea to one count of first-degree arson for setting a garage in Jefferson, Frederick County, ablaze on April 3, 2018, while the occupants of the attached home were in bed; he awaits sentencing while active arson cases against Crawford in Montgomery, Howard, and Prince George's counties continue.

Prince George's County Police Department District 8 Station in Upper Marlboro CDP serves the community.

Education
The city is served by the Prince George's County Public Schools and District 7 of the County's Board of Education.

Elementary schools that serve the city include:
 District Heights Elementary School
 Formerly included District Heights Parkway Elementary, whose building makes up half the current school, and which fed primary grades to District Heights Elementary following 2nd or 3rd grade
 North Forestville Elementary School

Middle schools that serve the city include:
 Drew-Freeman Middle School (7-8)
 Walker Mill Middle School

High schools that serve the city include:
 Dr. Henry A. Wise Jr. High School
 Suitland High School

Francis Scott Key Elementary School is neither in the city, nor serves the city, but has a District Heights postal address. The district previously operated Berkshire Elementary School in what is now Suitland CDP, near District Heights. Berkshire Elementary closed in 2009.

Public libraries
The Prince George's County Memorial Library System operates the Spauldings Branch Library near District Heights. The library opened to the public in 1987 and is named after the area's original 19th century Spaldings election district (which changed in spelling to Spauldings in the 20th century when the election district was reapportioned).

Public Spaces
There are several public spaces and parks within the District Heights locale, these include sports recreational fields adjacent to the Municipal Center on Marbury Drive, an outdoor athletic exercise area along District Heights Parkway, the Hartman-Berkshire Park on Walters Lane, green spaces along the length of Kipling Parkway, and a 2021 dedicated Veteran's Memorial Park at the junction of Marbury Drive and Kipling Parkway. There is also a neighborhood mini-park on Lakehurst Street in North Forestville and a small Maryland National Capital Park next to the North Forestville Elementary School.

Transportation

The only highway passing directly through District Heights is Maryland Route 458. MD 458 connects southwest to Maryland Route 5, which provides access to Washington, D.C. and Interstate 95/Interstate 495 (Capital Beltway). 
The Washington Metropolitan Area Transit Authority (Metro Bus) serves the town via The District Heights–Suitland Line, designated Route V12; the District Heights–Seat Pleasant Line, designated Route V14; the Marlboro Pike Line, designated Route J12; and the Forestville Line, designated as Route K12.

References

External links

 
 Maryland State Archives District Heights site

Cities in Maryland
Washington metropolitan area
Cities in Prince George's County, Maryland
Populated places established in 1925
1925 establishments in Maryland